Tonight (also released as Straight No Chaser) is an album by the Clark Terry-Bob Brookmeyer Quintet, with Brookmeyer on trombone and Terry on trumpet and flugelhorn. With tracks recorded in 1964, the album was released on the Mainstream label the following year.

Background
The Clark Terry-Bob Brookmeyer Quintet was formed in 1961 at the request of Frank Cantarina, the owner of the Half Note Club in New York City. The original group, consisting of Terry and Brookmeyer with Joe Benjamin (double bass), Osie Johnson (drums) and Eddie Costa (piano), had recorded, for another label, a live session at the club. That recording had to be abandoned because of the "horrible intonation of the piano". Brookmeyer had made the first advances to Terry, but Terry was under network contract and could only take outside engagements as a band leader - hence the name of the quintet and the name of the album. The band was featured several times "with unanimous acceptance" on NBC's The Tonight Show Starring Johnny Carson.

Style
In the liner notes for the original 1965 album, Peter Spargo wrote, ".. the blend between Terry's horn and Brookmeyer's valve trombone is warm and original." He refers to the "brilliant piano work" of Kellaway and describes Bailey's drumming performance as having "impeccable taste and controlled nuances". Of Bill Crow's double bass playing, Spargo wrote, "His lines are clear and interesting, the pitch crisp and audible and he gives the entire group a solid foundation."

Of the album overall, Spargo wrote:
With such a  brilliant rhythm section it is obvious that Clark and Bob feel relaxed and are allowed complete independence. It is also apparent from their ensemble duets that they are in complete control and know exactly what they want. Their individual solos are always intelligent and meaningful. So as Clark apologized for having kept you waiting, it is safe to that this album was worth waiting for.

Reception

Awarding the album 3 stars, AllMusics Scott Yanow wrote, "Flugelhornist Clark Terry and valve trombonist Bob Brookmeyer made for a very complementary pair in their mid-'60s quintet. Both had distinctive but similar sounds, impressive technique, the ability to swing anything and plenty of wit... Unfortunately, all ten selections clock in at around three minutes, so there is no real stretching out, but what is here is excellent."

Track listing

 "Tete a Tete" (Terry) - 3:02  
 "Pretty Girl" (Brookmeyer) - 3:00  
 "Blue China" (Brookmeyer) - 2:59  
 "Hum" (Brookmeyer) - 3:40  
 "Blindman, Blindman" (Herbie Hancock) - 2:29  
 "Step Right Up" (Roger Kellaway) - 2:57  
 "Weep" (Gary McFarland) - 2:55  
 "Straight No Chaser" (Thelonious Monk) - 2:49  
 "Sometime Ago" (Sergio Mihanovich) - 3:02  
 "Hymn" (Charlie Parker) - 2:42

all tracks Terry (trumpet), except 4 and 5 Terry (flugelhorn)

Issues and formats
The album was originally issued by Mainstream, in mono format as M56043 and in stereo format as S/6043. It was also issued as  Mainstream MSTD102 under the title What'd he say?. It was later issued, in CD format, as Mainstream MDCD728, entitled Clark Terry/Bobby Brookmeyer Quintet.

The album was issued in the UK in 1965, by Fontana, with the title Tonight (TL 5265). It was also issued by Mainstream with the title Straight No Chaser (MRL-320).

The same track listing was also released, in CD format, by Lonehill Jazz, as LHJ10199, entitled Clark Terry/Bob Brookmeyer Quintet - Complete Studio Recordings and on Mainstream MRL320 in Japan as ECPL-125MS.

A single from the album, "Blindman, Blindman" (b/w "Straight No Chaser"), was also issued by Mainstream.

Personnel

Musicians
Clark Terry - trumpet, flugelhorn
Bob Brookmeyer - valve trombone
Roger Kellaway - piano
Bill Crow - double bass  
Dave Bailey - drums

Production
Bob Shad - artists and repertoire
Bob Arnold - recording engineer
Hal Diepold - mastering
Peter Spargo - liner notes
Harry Ringler - production coordinator
Elena Festa - album coordination
Jack Lonshein - cover art and design
The Composing Rooms Inc - typography
Global Albums Inc - printing and fabrication
Burt Andrews - liner photographs

References 

1965 albums
Clark Terry albums
Bob Brookmeyer albums
Mainstream Records albums
Albums produced by Bob Shad